Cheruvattoor is a village in the municipality of Kothamangalam, in the eastern part of Ernakulam District, in the southern Indian state of Kerala.

Location

The main junctions  of the village are GMHS School Junction (also known as High Court Junction), MM Kavala Junction and Govt. UP School Junction. These intersections lead to adjacent small towns such as Paipra, Nellikkuzhi, Puthupady, Irumalapady, Methala, Odakalli and Thrikkariyoor.

Administration
The Village Office is in Iramalloor. The Panchayath Office is in Nellikuzhi. The nearest police station in Kothamangalam.

Education

Schools
GMHS School Cheruvattoor
NECT Public School
Govt. UP School

Engineering colleges 
KMP College of Engineering, Cherukunnam
MA College of Engineering, Kothamangalam
Ilahia College of Engineering and Technology, Muvattupuzha

Kerala Agricultural University

Places of worship
 Cheruvattoor Adivaadu Juma Masjid
 Bagavathi Kaavu
 Madasseri Sri Dharma Sastha Temple
 Cheruvattoor Pallypady Mosque
 Themamkuzhy Mahadeva Temple
 SNDP YOGAM Cheruvattor Shaga
 Kuzhuppilly Sree Dharma Shasta Temple
 Olil muhiyudheen Juma Masjid

Historical places
Kallil Temple Methala
Thrikkariyoor Temple

Politics
Cheruvattoor assembly constituency is part of Muvattupuzha Lok Sabha constituency and Kothamangalam Legislative Assembly.  Antony John, Communist Party of India (Marxist) (CPIM), was the Member of Legislative Assembly for Kothamangalam.

Transport
The nearest Kerala State Road Transport Corporation (KSRTC) bus stations are Muvattupuzha and Kothamangalam.

Road
Cheruvattoor is connected to Aluva–Munnar Highway (AM Road) via  Irumalapady–Puthupady and Nellikuzhi–Paipra roads. It is connected to National Highway 85 (Old NH 49) via Irumalapady–Puthupady road and M.M Kavala–Sub-Station Road, and to Main Central Road (MC Road) via Nellikuzhi–Paipra Road.

Railway

Air

Health care
Primary health centre. The Govt. Ayurveda Hospital and Govt. Veterinary Hospitals

References

Cities and towns in Ernakulam district